Stantec Tower is a 66-storey above and 4 underground,  mixed-use skyscraper in Ice District in the downtown core of Edmonton, Alberta, Canada. The office area of the tower opened on September 26, 2018, and the residential portion opened in 2019.

The 66-storey tower consists of retail space, offices, and 454 residential units. It houses the headquarters of Stantec and is located close to Rogers Place, home of the NHL's Edmonton Oilers, and near the centre of Ice District directly northwest of Downtown Edmonton.

Construction

Engineering and design work was completed by Stantec themselves and unveiled to the public on August 26, 2014.

Construction started in the fall of 2014, completing foundation works and moving above grade in August 2016. The project reached a milestone when it topped out the 30th floor, marking the top of the commercial and office floors, in November 2017.

Stantec Tower had reached its 30th floor just 14 days after its next door neighbour, JW Marriott Edmonton Ice District & Residences, had become the tallest building in Edmonton. Both these construction projects continued adding floors, with the JW Marriott Edmonton Ice District & Residences reaching its full height in March 2018.

The tower opened on September 26, 2018, with employees of commercial tenants moving in to occupy 29 floors in October 2018. On November 16, 2018 the tower was fully topped out, becoming the tallest building in Canada outside of Toronto. Dismantling of the crane took place in March 2019, as work on the SKY residences neared completion, with residents expected to move in starting in the fall. In November of that year, it was announced that, due to poor sales, the bottom 12 floors of the planned SKY residences would be converted into hotel space. Existing owners in the affected units would be upgraded to higher floors at no additional cost.

Major tenants
In September 2019, Stantec sold the 29 floors of commercial space to German real estate company Deka Immobilien, a subsidiary of DekaBank. The sale was facilitated by the high commercial occupancy, including:

PwC Canada - two floors - 
Dentons Canada - 3 floors (Floors 24, 25, and 26) Q2 of 2019.
Stantec
DLA Piper

See also
 List of tallest buildings in Edmonton
 List of tallest buildings in Canada

References

External links

Ice District Properties
Stantec.com Info on Project

Headquarters in Canada
Skyscraper office buildings in Canada
Skyscrapers in Edmonton
Ice District
Residential skyscrapers in Canada